Arthur Ashe Boulevard (also referred to as "the Boulevard") is a historic street in the near the West End of Richmond, Virginia, providing access to Byrd Park. It serves as the border between the Carytown/Museum District to the west and the Fan district to the east. Attempts were made to rename the street after Arthur Ashe, a tennis star and social activist who was born and grew up in Richmond, but previous attempts failed until February 2019 when Richmond City Council voted in favor of changing the name to Arthur Ashe Boulevard. Near the south end is Richmond's Boulevard Bridge (commonly called the "Nickel Bridge", in reference to its historical initial toll) across the James River. Arthur Ashe Boulevard intersects with main arteries Cary Street, Main Street, Monument Avenue, Broad Street (where the Historic District ends), Leigh Street, and Interstate 64/95, and terminates at Hermitage Road. The Diamond is located on Arthur Ashe Boulevard. The intersection of Arthur Ashe Boulevard and Monument Avenue featured a statue of Stonewall Jackson.

Arthur Ashe Boulevard is designated as State Route 161, a route promoted in the 1940s and 1950s as an alternate bypass route before the Richmond-Petersburg Turnpike and Interstate 95 were built, connecting with U.S. Route 1 north and south of downtown Richmond.

In 2019 American artist Kehinde Wiley's outdoor sculpture Rumors of War was erected adjacent to Arthur Ashe Boulevard. It is part of the Virginia Museum of Fine Arts permanent art collection. It stands between the museum and the United Daughters of the Confederacy headquarters. The sculpture was created by Wiley as a response to the J.E.B. Stuart monument and the other Confederate equestrian statues on Monument Avenue.

References

Historic districts on the National Register of Historic Places in Virginia
Transportation in Richmond, Virginia
National Register of Historic Places in Richmond, Virginia
Roads on the National Register of Historic Places in Virginia